Eufaula is an unincorporated community in Cowlitz County, Washington. Eufaula is located northwest of the city of Longview, reached by traveling westbound out of the city along Washington State Route 4, also known as Ocean Beach Highway, turning north onto Coal Creek Road and then Harmony Drive. The Eufaula community is part of the Longview School District, a K-12 school district of about 6,600 students.

Geography
Eufaula is located at  (46.1956663, -123.0478938).

External links
Longview Public Schools website

References

Unincorporated communities in Cowlitz County, Washington
Unincorporated communities in Washington (state)